Ribault River is a tributary of the Trout River. It is located entirely in Jacksonville, Florida. The river is named after Jean Ribault, a French naval officer. The river cuts through the forest floor near its source, that portion of the river being classified as a creek. The river flows northward, as does the St. Johns River and many of the other tributaries of the Trout River.

Crossings 
This is a list of bridges that cross the Ribault River, starting at the river's source.

See also 
List of Florida rivers
Jacksonville, Florida
Jean Ribault
St. Johns River

References

Jacksonville, Florida
Rivers of Florida
Bodies of water of Duval County, Florida
Northside, Jacksonville